Robert Bénard (1734 in Paris – 1777) was a French engraver.

Specialized in the technique of engraving, Robert Bénard is mainly famous for having supplied a significant amount of plates (at least 1,800) to the Encyclopédie by Diderot & d'Alembert from 1751.

Later, publisher Charles-Joseph Panckoucke reused many of his productions to illustrate the works of his catalog.

Biographical research established in 2019 that his real name was Jacques Renaud Benard, that he was born in 1731 at Rosny-sous-Bois, and that he died in Paris in 1794. 

The signature "Benard fecit" on plates probably indicates the work of his own hand; the signatures "Benard Direx" and "Benard Direxit" indicate the work of the atelier of engravers he directed for many years.

References

External links
 Robert Bénard on data.bnf.fr
 Robert Bénard at the National Portrait Gallery 

 M. Pinault-Sørensen, F. A. Kafker, Notices sur les collaborateurs du recueil de planches de l'Encyclopédie, 1995, n° 18-19, p. 204.

18th-century French engravers
Artists from Paris
1734 births
1777 deaths
Contributors to the Encyclopédie (1751–1772)